Dokdonella fugitiva is a Gram-negative, strictly aerobic, rod-shaped, and non-motile bacterium from the genus of Dokdonella which has been isolated from potting soil from Portugal.

References

External links
Type strain of Dokdonella fugitiva at BacDive -  the Bacterial Diversity Metadatabase

Xanthomonadales
Bacteria described in 2006